Dimitile is a mountainous zone on the island of Réunion, located towards its southern end.

See also
Isle de la Reunion

Mountains of Réunion
Réunion National Park